The Fourth Fraser ministry (Liberal–National Country/National coalition) was the 53rd ministry of the Government of Australia. It was led by the country's 22nd Prime Minister, Malcolm Fraser. The Fourth Fraser ministry succeeded the Third Fraser ministry, which dissolved on 3 November 1980 following the federal election that took place in October. The ministry was replaced by the first Hawke ministry on 11 March 1983 following the federal election that took place on 5 March which saw Labor defeat the Coalition.

Cabinet

Outer ministry

See also
 First Fraser ministry
 Second Fraser ministry
 Third Fraser ministry

Notes

Ministries of Elizabeth II
1980s in Australia
1980 establishments in Australia
1983 disestablishments in Australia
Fraser, 4
Cabinets established in 1980
Cabinets disestablished in 1983
Ministry, Fraser 4